Brett Elizabeth Anderson (born May 30, 1979 in Bloomington, Indiana, United States) is an American singer and was the lead vocalist of rock band The Donnas. She previously went by the name Donna A.

Early life 
Anderson was born on May 30, 1979, in Bloomington, Indiana. She moved to Palo Alto, California in the seventh grade. She met her bandmates Torry Castellano, Maya Ford and Allison Robertson in junior high school. They formed a band in eighth grade called Ragady Anne, later calling themselves The Electrocutes at Palo Alto High School.

Other work 
Anderson appeared on the album Brats on the Beat: Ramones for Kids singing "California Sun". Anderson is featured in the songs "Party Til We Die" by The Leftovers, "Hey There Ophelia" by MC Lars, and "Who's to Blame" and "My War" by Sugar Knives and has performed with Camp Freddy. Since The Donnas' hiatus in 2012 Anderson has begun singing in a few different bands under the names Born Angry, Alpha Beta and The Stripminers. In 2014, Anderson co-wrote and recorded soundtracks for Fitbit's "It's All Fit" campaign and the "Nissan Versa in Motion" commercial. Anderson also co-wrote and performed the music in the trailer for Edward Hemingway's "Bad Apple's Perfect Day".

In 2019, Anderson was completing a degree in psychology at Stanford University. In 2021, she was working toward a Master of Science in Gerontology at the University of Southern California and a Master of Social Work at UCLA.

In 2023, she provided lead vocals on the theme song of Netflix's That 90's Show.

References

External links 

Billboard Magazine Article: "Why Girl Groups Rule: The Donnas' Brett Anderson On Why 'Being a Girl' Isn't A Genre"

1979 births
Living people
21st-century American women singers
21st-century American singers
American women rock singers
American punk rock singers
American rock singers
Women punk rock singers
Musicians from Bloomington, Indiana
Singers from Indiana
The Donnas members